Silvana Blagoeva (born 14 July 1972) is a Bulgarian biathlete. She competed in three events at the 1992 Winter Olympics.

References

1972 births
Living people
Biathletes at the 1992 Winter Olympics
Bulgarian female biathletes
Olympic biathletes of Bulgaria
Place of birth missing (living people)